Colombo International Airport, Ratmalana (commonly known as Ratmalana International Airport, Colombo–Ratmalana and locally as Ratmalana Airport) , is the secondary international airport serving the city of Colombo, the capital of Sri Lanka. It was the country's first international airport and was the only international airport in Sri Lanka until the inauguration of Bandaranaike International Airport, Katunayake in 1967. The airport currently serves several domestic services and is home to several aviation training organisations. A relaxation of rules has recently seen the airport open for international corporate jet operations and charter flights. The airport is located 15 km south of the Colombo City.

The strategic significance of Colombo International Airport, Ratmalana has been identified along with the emerging Colombo Financial City, High End Tourism and business travel needs of High Net Worth Individuals (HNWIs). The long-term strategic goal of RMA is to bring the airport to the optimum operational capacity by maximum utilization of existing resources. Therefore, to achieve this goal, five strategic areas with specific strategies have been identified as Corporate Jet Operations, Domestic Aviation Hub, Aviation Training hub in the Region, FBO & MRO investments and Regional Airports Operations.

History

Launch
In 1934 the State Council of Ceylon made a decision to construct an aerodrome within reach of the capital city of Colombo and decided on Ratmalana as the best site. On 27 November 1935 a De Havilland Puss Moth flown by Captain Tyndale-Biscoe, chief flying instructor of the Madras Flying Club, was the first aircraft to land at the new airport.

Second World War

During the Second World War it was used as a Royal Air Force airfield, with No 30 Squadron flying Hawker Hurricanes from there against Japanese Navy aircraft. QEA flew civilianised Consolidated B-24 Liberator and Avro Lancastrian aeroplanes there from Perth, Western Australia, on what was at the time the world's longest non-stop air route.  The flight continued after the war with an intermediate re-fuelling stop at the Cocos Islands.

The following units were here at some point:

Peak of civilian service
Ratmalana airport at one time had the country's main air terminal, with the Douglas DC-3 Dakota and Lockheed Constellation aeroplanes of Air Ceylon flying out of it. In 1947, KLM flew Douglas DC-4 Skymasters through the airport on the route from the Netherlands to the Dutch East Indies (Indonesia)

In the 1950s, BOAC flew Canadair Argonauts (DC4 with Rolls-Royce Merlin engines) from Ratmalana to London.

On 11 August 1952, 3 months after the inaugural service of a passenger jet aircraft, BOAC began its Comet service between Colombo and London. Later (March 1962 - March 1971) Air Ceylon operated a Comet service on this route to London.  The airport was also a Trans World Airlines (TWA) destination for a short time in the 1950s.

Domestic-only era

In 1964, the government decided to build the new Bandaranaike International Airport north of the city, to replace Ratmalana.  The new airport was completed in 1967 and Ratmalana handed over all international services to the new airport.  Ratmalana was left with the relatively small market for domestic air travel in the country.

Return to international service
As of 27 March 2022, the airport resumed international travel after 55 years.

Expansion and upgrade
The airport is only 15 km south of the Colombo city centre compared to the larger Bandaranaike International Airport which is 32 km north of the city. The airport aims to attract private international flights and low-cost airlines. Helitours, an airline operated by the Sri Lankan Airforce is based at the airport.  There are a few industrial facilities such as the Bata shoe factory within a close proximity of the airport.  The Government is developing the Ratmalana airport into an international city airport, which would provide services to private jets and small aircraft. In addition facilities at the Ampara, Batticaloa, Jaffna, and Koggala airports will be also upgraded. Repair to the runway and reconfiguration to the aerodrome for the use of corporate jet traffic would be done as a short-term development project of the Ratmalana airport.  Improvements to the existing terminal building, repair to the runway, taxiway and apron, reconfiguration to the aerodrome for the use of corporate jet traffic would be done as a short-term development project of the Ratmalana airport.

Under the medium-term of the Ratmalana airport development project:
Improvements to the existing terminal building
Control tower
Taxiway
Road network improvements
Navigational equipment installations
Constructing a terminal for civil movements and apron also implemented

Current Facilities at the Airport

Ground Handling
Immigration Service
Baggage and Passenger screening as per ICAO Standards
Quarantine
Re-fueling
VIP Lounge
Aeronautical Information Services

Terminals
There are currently 2 terminals at the airport.
 Terminal 1: International Corporate Jets & Domestic 
 Terminal 2: International Regional Operations

Airlines and destinations

Passenger flights

Lodger Squadrons
 No. 8 Light Transport Squadron

Accidents and incidents

1960s
On 15 November 1961, Vickers Viscount VT-DIH of Indian Airlines was damaged beyond economic repair when the co-pilot retracted the undercarriage during landing.

1970s
On 7 September 1978, an Air Ceylon Hawker Siddeley HS 748 (registered 4R-ACJ) was destroyed in a fire while parked at Ratmalana Airport. Two pilots had been carrying out pre-departure checkups, when the fire started by the explosion of a bomb in the aircraft cargo hold.

1990s
 29 September 1998 - Lionair Flight 602, operated by an Antonov An-24RV, fell into the sea off the north-western coast of Sri Lanka under mysterious circumstances after departing Jaffna Airport bound for Ratmalana Airport. All 55 passengers and crew members died, including the four member Ukrainian cockpit crew.

See also

 Bandaranaike International Airport, primary international airport serving Colombo.
 Mattala Rajapaksa International Airport, a minor international airport serving Hambantota.
 Sri Lanka Air Force Museum
 List of airports in Sri Lanka

References

Citations

Bibliography

External links
 Official website of Colombo International Airport, Ratmalana
 Sri Lanka Air Force Base Ratmalana

Airports in Sri Lanka
Sri Lanka Air Force bases
Buildings and structures in Colombo District
World War II sites in Sri Lanka